Anthony "TJ" Waldburger Jr. (born April 25, 1988) is a retired American mixed martial artist who competed in the Welterweight division. A professional MMA competitor since 2005, he competed for the UFC, Shark Fights, and HDNet Fights.

Background
Waldburger went to Belton High School (Texas).

Mixed martial arts career

Early career
He held an amateur record of 3-0 before turning professional at the age of 17. He lost his professional debut against Sammy Say but defeated him in his next bout to move to 1-1.

At the event, IFC: Road to Global Domination, he lost to Josh Neer but rebounded with a win over Jeff Lindsay. Waldburger defeated UFC veteran Pete Spratt via triangle choke submission in the second round. Spratt demanded a rematch and got one defeating Waldburger via knockout. He lost another fight before winning three straight. His early accomplishments include winning the Shark Fights Welterweight Championship belt in May 2009 and then defending it in September 2009.

Ultimate Fighting Championship
In July 2010 it was announced Waldburger had signed with the UFC. His debut came at UFC Fight Night 22 against David Mitchell. He won the fight via unanimous decision.

Waldburger was expected to face Matthew Riddle on December 11, 2010 at UFC 124.  However, Waldburger was forced from the card with an injury.

Waldburger was expected to face Dennis Hallman on March 26, 2011 at UFC Fight Night 24. However, Hallman was forced out of the bout with an injury and replaced by Johny Hendricks. Waldburger was defeated early in round one via TKO.

Waldburger was expected to face Daniel Roberts on September 17, 2011 at UFC Fight Night 25.  However, Roberts was forced out of the bout with an injury and replaced by promotional newcomer Mike Stumpf. Waldburger defeated Stumpf via first round triangle choke submission earning Submission of the Night honors.

Waldburger next faced Jake Hecht on March 3, 2012 at UFC on FX 2. He won the fight via submission in the first round.

Waldburger faced Brian Ebersole on June 22, 2012 at UFC on FX 4. He lost the back-and-forth fight via unanimous decision.

Waldburger faced Nick Catone on December 15, 2012 at The Ultimate Fighter: Team Carwin vs. Team Nelson Finale. He won the fight via technical submission in the second round. He earned the Submission of the Night honors for his performance.

Waldburger was expected to face Sean Pierson on June 15, 2013 at UFC 161.  However, Waldburger was pulled from the event and replaced by Kenny Robertson.

Waldburger faced Adlan Amagov on October 19, 2013 at UFC 166. He lost the fight by knockout in the first round.

Waldburger faced Mike Pyle on February 22, 2014 at UFC 170. He lost the fight via TKO in the third round.

Waldburger was expected to face Wendell Oliveira on February 22, 2015 at UFC Fight Night 61.  However, the fight was cancelled on the day of the weigh ins, as Waldburger passed out while cutting weight. Both fighters were paid their show money.

The bout with Oliveira was rescheduled for May 30, 2015 at UFC Fight Night 67. However, it was scrapped yet again after Waldburger pulled out of the bout on May 19 due to undisclosed reasons. He was replaced by promotional newcomer Darren Till. In turn, Waldburger was released from the promotion.

Personal life
Waldburger is married to Shayla Moore who is the daughter of his coach, John Moore of the Grappler's Lair gym. They have two sons and one daughter as of 2017.

Championships and accomplishments
Ultimate Fighting Championship
Submission of the Night (Two times)  vs. Mike Stumpf, Nick Catone 
Shark Fights
Shark Fights Welterweight Championship (One time)
One successful championship defense

Mixed martial arts record 

|-
| Loss
| align=center|16–9
| Mike Pyle
| TKO (elbows and punches)
| UFC 170
| 
| align=center| 3
| align=center| 4:03
| Las Vegas, Nevada, United States
|
|-
| Loss
| align=center| 16–8
| Adlan Amagov
| KO (punches)
| UFC 166
| 
| align=center| 1
| align=center| 3:00
| Houston, Texas, United States
| 
|-
| Win
| align=center| 16–7
| Nick Catone
| Technical Submission (triangle choke)
| The Ultimate Fighter 16 Finale
| 
| align=center| 2
| align=center| 1:04
| Las Vegas, Nevada, United States
| 
|-
| Loss
| align=center| 15–7
| Brian Ebersole
| Decision (unanimous)
| UFC on FX: Maynard vs. Guida
| 
| align=center| 3
| align=center| 5:00
| Atlantic City, New Jersey, United States
| 
|-
| Win
| align=center| 15–6
| Jake Hecht
| Submission (armbar)
| UFC on FX: Alves vs. Kampmann
| 
| align=center| 1
| align=center| 0:55
| Sydney, Australia
| 
|-
| Win
| align=center| 14–6
| Mike Stumpf
| Submission (triangle choke)
| UFC Fight Night: Shields vs. Ellenberger
| 
| align=center| 1
| align=center| 3:52
| New Orleans, Louisiana, United States
| 
|-
| Loss
| align=center| 13–6
| Johny Hendricks
| TKO (punches)
| UFC Fight Night: Nogueira vs. Davis
| 
| align=center| 1
| align=center| 1:35
| Seattle, Washington, United States
| 
|-
| Win
| align=center| 13–5
| David Mitchell
| Decision (unanimous)
| UFC Fight Night: Marquardt vs. Palhares
| 
| align=center| 3
| align=center| 5:00
| Austin, Texas, United States
| 
|-
| Win
| align=center| 12–5
| Pat Healy
| Decision (unanimous)
| Shark Fights 6: Stars & Stripes
| 
| align=center| 3
| align=center| 5:00
| Amarillo, Texas, United States
| 
|-
| Win
| align=center| 11–5
| Shannon Ritch
| Submission (armbar)
| Shark Fights 4: Richards vs Schoonover
| 
| align=center| 1
| align=center| 1:37
| Lubbock, Texas, United States
| 
|-
| Win
| align=center| 10–5
| Andrew Chappelle
| TKO (doctor stoppage)
| SWC 3: St. Valentine's Day Massacre
| 
| align=center| 1
| align=center| 3:00
| Frisco, Texas, United States
| 
|-
| Loss
| align=center| 9–5
| Ricardo Funch
| TKO (punches)
| Xtreme Fighting Championship
| 
| align=center| 2
| align=center| 2:35
| Austin, Texas, United States
| 
|-
| Loss
| align=center| 9–4
| Pete Spratt
| KO (punches)
| HDNet Fights 1
| 
| align=center| 1
| align=center| 1:29
| Dallas, Texas, United States
| 
|-
| Win
| align=center| 9–3
| Pete Spratt
| Submission (triangle choke)
| King of Kombat
| 
| align=center| 2
| align=center| 1:30
| Austin, Texas, United States
| 
|-
| Win
| align=center| 8–3
| Jeff Lindsay
| Submission
| Masters of the Cage 14
| 
| align=center| 1
| align=center| 1:27
| Oklahoma City, Oklahoma, United States
| 
|-
| Loss
| align=center| 7–3
| Josh Neer
| TKO (punches)
| IFC: Road to Global Domination
| 
| align=center| 1
| align=center| 0:24
| Belton, Texas, United States
| 
|-
| Win
| align=center| 7–2
| Jeff Lindsay
| Submission (triangle choke)
| Masters of the Cage 7
| 
| align=center| 1
| align=center| 2:43
| Norman, Oklahoma, United States
| 
|-
| Win
| align=center| 6–2
| Brian Foster
| Submission (armbar)
| Masters of the Cage 4
| 
| align=center| 1
| align=center| 0:29
| Oklahoma City, Oklahoma, United States
| 
|-
| Win
| align=center| 5–2
| Barry Peoples
| Submission (achilles lock)
| DPP: September to Remember
| 
| align=center| 1
| align=center| 0:15
| Lafayette, Louisiana, United States
| 
|-
| Win
| align=center| 4–2
| Jeremiah O'Neal
| Submission (armbar)
| Xtreme Fighting Championship VII
| 
| align=center| 1
| align=center| 4:23
| Austin, Texas, United States
| 
|-
| Win
| align=center| 3–2
| Brandon Berkey
| Submission
| Ultimate Texas Showdown 6
| 
| align=center| 1
| align=center| 1:22
| Frisco, Texas, United States
| 
|-
| Loss
| align=center| 2–2
| Todd Moore
| Decision (unanimous)
| Renegades Extreme Fighting
| 
| align=center| 3
| align=center| 5:00
| Houston, Texas, United States
| 
|-
| Win
| align=center| 2–1
| Nathan Fussel
| Submission (rear-naked choke)
| Xtreme Fighting Championship 5
| 
| align=center| 1
| align=center| 1:50
| Austin, Texas, United States
| 
|-
| Win
| align=center| 1–1
| Sammy Say
| Submission (triangle choke)
| Renegades Extreme Fighting
| 
| align=center| 1
| align=center| 1:57
| Austin, Texas, United States
| 
|-
| Loss
| align=center| 0–1
| Sammy Say
| TKO (punches)
| Ultimate Texas Showdown 3
| 
| align=center| 1
| align=center| 1:18
| Dallas, Texas, United States
|

See also
 List of male mixed martial artists

References

External links
 
 
 

1988 births
Living people
American male mixed martial artists
American practitioners of Brazilian jiu-jitsu
People awarded a black belt in Brazilian jiu-jitsu
Mixed martial artists from Texas
People from Temple, Texas
Welterweight mixed martial artists
Mixed martial artists utilizing Brazilian jiu-jitsu
Ultimate Fighting Championship male fighters